Jon Moore (born 17 November 1955 in Cardiff, Glamorganshire, Wales), is a Welsh footballer who played as a left back in the Football League.

References

External links

1955 births
Living people
Welsh footballers
Footballers from Cardiff
Association football defenders
Maidstone United F.C. (1897) players
Ebbsfleet United F.C. players
AFC Bournemouth players
Millwall F.C. players
Bristol Rovers F.C. players
English Football League players